2011–12 in Kenyan football may refer to:
 2011 in Kenyan football
 2012 in Kenyan football